Macorix (/maso'riʃ/, also rendered Maçorís and Mazorij) was the language of the northern coast of what is today the Dominican Republic. Spanish accounts only refer to three languages on the island: Taino, Macorix, and neighboring Ciguayo. The Macorix people appear to have been semi-sedentary and their presence seems to have predated the agricultural Taino who came to occupy much of the island.  For the early European writers, they shared similarities with the nearby Ciguayos. Their language appears to have been moribund at the time of the Spanish Conquest, and within a century it was extinct.

Divisions
Upper Macoris was spoken on the north-central coast of the Roman Catholic Diocese of Magua from Puerto Plata to Nagua, and inland to San Francisco de Macorís and further. It was also distributed on the southeast coast of Hispaniola around San Pedro de Macorís.

Lower Macoris was spoken in the northwestern part of the Roman Catholic Diocese of Magua from Monte Cristi to Puerto Plata, and from the coast inland to the area of Santiago de los Caballeros.

Lexicon
Little is known of Macorix apart from it being a distinct language from Taino and neighboring Ciguayo. A negative form, baeza , is the only element of the language that is directly attested. Baeza could be Arawakan (though not Taino or Iñeri), analyzable as ba-ésa 'no-thing' = 'nothing'. (Cf. Manao ma-esa 'no, not', Paresis ma-isa 'not'. The negative prefix is ba- in Amarakaeri which, even if it is related to the Arawakan languages, is not close enough to be relevant here.)

Toponyms
There are also some non-Taino toponyms from the area that Granberry & Vescelius (2004) suggest may be Waroid:

(Cf. a similar list at Guanahatabey language.)

See also
Pre-Arawakan languages of the Greater Antilles

References

Granberry, Julian, & Gary Vescelius (2004) Languages of the Pre-Columbian Antilles, University Alabama Press, Tuscaloosa, 

Languages of the Dominican Republic
Languages of Haiti
Pre-Arawakan languages of the Greater Antilles
Extinct languages of North America
Languages extinct in the 16th century